Flagstaff Mall is a regional shopping mall located in Flagstaff, Arizona, is operated by Cypress Equities. The mall opened in 1979, and is anchored by Dillard's and JCPenney.

History
Flagstaff Mall opened in 1979, developed by Phoenix-based real estate company Westcor. The shopping center's original anchors JCPenney and Sears had previously existed in downtown Flagstaff, but had moved to anchor the shopping center at opening. Dillard's joined the shopping center in 1986.

In 2015, Sears Holdings spun off 235 of its properties, including the Sears at Flagstaff Mall, into Seritage Growth Properties.

On August 22, 2018, it was announced that Sears would be closing as part of a plan to close 46 stores nationwide. The store closed in November 2018.

In 2020, the shopping center opened a Hobby Lobby, Starbucks and an entertainment wing for indoor and outdoor use.

References

External links
 

Buildings and structures in Flagstaff, Arizona
Shopping malls in Arizona
1979 establishments in Arizona
Shopping malls established in 1979